The Iranian Mathematical Society (IMS) is the main mathematical society in Iran. It was officially registered in 1971 by Professor Mehdi Behzad, who was the first president of IMS. The current president of IMS is Professor Mohammad Sal Moslehian.

Aims and Scops 

The main goals of IMS are to promote education and research in mathematical sciences to the highest level of excellence as well as foster the awareness of mathematics and its connections to other basic sciences.

Publications 
The first publication of IMS is the Bulletin of the Iranian Mathematical Society  which was first published in 1973. The other publications of IMS are
 Journal of the Iranian Mathematical Society
 Culture and Thoughts of Mathematics 
 Newsletter of the Iranian Mathematical Society

Awards 
The IMS awards several prizes:
 Mirzakhani Award
 Riazi Kermani Award
 Behzad Award 
 Radjabalipour Award
 Vesal Award
 Shafieiha Award
 Hashtroudi Award
 Fatemi Award
 Mosahab Award
 Ghorbani Award

References

External links
 The IMS website

Mathematical societies
1971 establishments in Iran
Learned societies of Iran
Organizations established in 1971